King Street is located in the central business district (CBD) of Perth, Western Australia. The street has a very European feel with its early 20th century, low-rise architecture and restored facades.

History
The street was originally called King William Street and was probably named after King William IV. Its name appears for the first time on maps of the Land Department in 1840.

Commonly known locally as the start of the "West End", it transverses two of Perth's major streets, Murray Street and Hay Street. Between the two there are around a dozen shops, including many high-end stores such as McKilroy, Louis Vuitton, Gucci, Chanel, Prada, Kookai, Bally, Georg Jensen, Tiffany & Co., Sass and Bide, Watches of Switzerland, Zomp, Dilettante, Hunt Leather, Longchamp, and many other stores and cafes.

Other high end retailers surround King Street on Hay Street, including Burberry, Emporio Armani, Canali, Hugo Boss and Apple.

During significant changes in the Perth CBD in the 1980s, King Street was recognised as being a significant remnant of Perth's earlier streetscapes.

The street precinct is listed with the Heritage Council of Western Australia.

See also

References

External links

Shopping districts and streets in Australia
Streets in Perth central business district, Western Australia